The CTOE - Centro de Tropas de Operações Especiais (Special Operations Troops Centre), based in Lamego, is a unit of the Portuguese Army with the mission of instructing troops in unconventional warfare and counter-terrorism. Until 2006, it was known as CIOE - Centro de Instrução de Operações Especiais (Special Operations Instruction Centre).

The CTOE contains an operational unit called DOE - Destacamento de Operações Especiais (Special Operations Detachment), popularly known as Rangers, tasked with performing missions similar to the US Army's Delta Force or British Special Air Service. Some of these missions include conducting long-range reconnaissance patrols, raids against high-value targets  and enemy bases or hideouts, hostage rescue, covert operations, guerrilla warfare, locating enemy command and control centres, targeting and destruction of enemy air defences and radar systems, and POW rescue operations. The unit can be infiltrated by parachute, helicopter, small boat, or by foot.

History 

The CTOE, heir of the historical traditions of Regimento de Infantaria 9 (9th Infantry Regiment), was created on 16 April 1960 to form units specialised in counter-guerrilla operations, psychological operations, and mountaineering. These special, light-infantry units were called Caçadores Especiais (Special Hunters; the regular army light-infantry units were just called Hunters) and were the first units in the Portuguese Army to wear a beret (brown) and camouflage. They were elite units, with highly motivated, hand-picked personnel, whose instructors had taken courses on counter-insurgency and counter-guerrilla operations in France, Algeria, the United States, the United Kingdom, and Spain. When the Portuguese Colonial War began in 1961, there were already four companies of Special Hunters in Angola. Early in the fighting, the Caçadores Especiais received updated 7,62 mm NATO small arms such as the Espingarda m/961 (Heckler & Koch G3) and the FN/German G1 FAL rifle (known as the m/962); the FAL was a favored weapon of the Caçadores Especiais due to its lighter weight and better practical accuracy compared to the m/961 G3. The 4th Company Caçadores Especiais in particular was a very active one (their website contains many photos and detailed mission chronology). Still, by the end of 1961, the Special Hunters had been disbanded: some of their training was incorporated into the instruction of the regular army Hunter companies, and the brown beret and camouflage spread to the whole Army. The CTOE remained, now tasked with giving their courses to officers and NCOs, and to form commando troops.

After the creation of the special operations unit in 1981, the CTOE ceased to be just an instruction facility but also served as the HQ for the new Portuguese special operations unit. The unit members wear a grass green beret and are the heir of the Special Hunters: the beret badge includes a trumpet — a symbol of the Special Hunters; and the unit is known as Rangers because the first instructors of the Special Hunters completed the United States Army Ranger Course and adapted the characteristics of that training to the Special Operations Course. The unit has operated in Bosnia and Herzegovina, East-Timor, Kosovo, Afghanistan, Iraq and Mali.

CTOE courses 
The CTOE has several courses:

 COE - Curso de Operações Especiais (Special Operations Course): direct action (reconnaissance, raids, hostage and POW rescues) and indirect action (insurgency and guerrilla, counter-insurgency and counter-guerrilla, military aid)].
 Sniper Course (requires previous COE).
 Long Range Reconnaissance Patrol Course (requires previous COE): reconnaissance and direct action special operations.
 Irregular Operations Course (only for officers and NCOs of the permanent cadre): organisation, instruction, and orientation of irregular forces with of the objective of defending the national territory (Portugal) when invaded and start the resistance.
 Psychological Operations Course.
 Mountaineering Course.
 Terrorist Threats' Prevention and Combat Course.

For those already badged as special operations soldiers, there are also courses outside the CTOE:

 Combat Diving Course
 Demolitions Course
 Forward Air Controller Course
 Combat Medic Course
 Signals Course
 NBC Course
 HUMINT Course
 Military Parachuting Course
 Small Boat Handling Course

Special Operations soldiers also take courses in friendly countries:

 Airborne / Special Forces - United States
 Sniper Course - United Kingdom
 Winter Patrol Course - Germany
 Long Range Reconnaissance Patrol School Course - Germany
 Special Operations Course - Spain
 Cold weather training - Norway
 Jungle Warfare - Brazil

Organization 
The CTOE is regiment level unit, commanded by a colonel, which includes:
 Commanding officer
 Staff
Headquarters Company
Training Battalion
Public Attendance Office
Special Operations Force

Special Operations Force 
The Special Operations Force (FOE - Força de Operações Especiais) is the operational component of the CTOE. It can constitute a special operations task group (SOTG) or it can contribute to a joint SOTG which can be created with special operations elements from other branches of the Armed Forces.

Organisation 
The FOE is commanded by a lieutenant-colonel and includes six special operations task units (SOTU). Each SOTU is commanded by a captain (except SOTU A1, which is commanded by a major) and includes 16 elements (only officers and NCOs).

The FOE includes:
 Headquarters and Staff
 Headquarters Company
Headquarters
Communications Platoon
Medical Platoon
Sniper Platoon
Support Platoon
Joint Terminal Attack Controller Section,
Technical Exploitations Operations Section
Mini-Unmanned Aerial Vehicle Section;
 SOTU A1
 SOTU A2
 SOTU B1
 SOTU B2
 SOTU C1
 SOTU C2

Selection and training 
Training to become a member of the Special Operations Force takes 30-32 weeks (30 weeks for enlisted soldiers, 32 weeks for officer and non-commissioned officers. Successful candidates are expected to serve a minimum of two years.

This is broken down in the following stages:

Basic training; This 5 weeks stage aims to provide the candidate with basic military training, with an introduction to military culture at this stage.

Additional training (stage 1); This 7 week stage aims to provide advanced military training, and combat technique is given at this stage.

Additional training (stage 2); This 5 week stage aims to provide the military with military leadership training, at this stage command and leadership modules are taught. This training is only for Officer, and Non-commissioned Officers.

Special Operations Force course; The Special Operations Specialty course enables the military to carry out missions of a strategic, operational or tactical scope, with a high degree of independence and in conditions of great risk and in which qualities of spirit of sacrifice, adaptation, tenacity, strong will and constant, rusticity and resistance, sobriety and discretion, camaraderie and cohesion. This stage is 13 weeks for enlisted men, while for Officers and Non-Commissioned Officers it is 15 weeks.

Equipment

Handguns
Glock 17 Gen 5
Heckler & Koch P30 limited use

Shotguns
Fabarm STF 12 
Franchi SPAS-15
Benelli M4 Super 90
Benelli Supernova

Submachine guns
Heckler und Koch MP5A5, Heckler und Koch MP5SD6 and Heckler und Koch MP5KA4

Assault rifles
Heckler und Koch HK417A2
Heckler und Koch HK416, A5 and A7 variants.
Heckler und Koch G36K, Heckler und Koch G36KE and Heckler und Koch G36C

Machine guns
H&K MG4
FN Minimi Mk3
FN MAG
Browning M2HB

Sniper rifles
Barrett M107
Barrett M95
Accuracy International Arctic Warfare-SF
Accuracy International AWSM (L115A1) and L115A3 limited use
Accuracy International AXMC .338
Heckler & Koch G28 sniper limited use

Grenade launchers 
 Heckler & Koch 269 (Used on Heckler & Koch HK416)
 Heckler & Koch AG36 (Used on Heckler & Koch G36)
 Heckler & Koch GMG

Anti-tank weapons 

 Carl Gustaf M3
 M72A3 LAW

Vehicles 

 URO VAMTAC ST5
 Ranger Special Operations Vehicle
 Land Rover Defender 110
 Mitsubishi L200
 Polaris Sportsman MV850
 Polaris MRZR D2
 Polaris MRZR D4

See also
Fernando Robles
Equipment of the Portuguese Army
Portuguese Army

References

External links 

Army units and formations of Portugal
Special forces of Portugal
Military counterterrorist organizations
Lamego